Hugh Gray may refer to:

Hugh Gray (theologian) (before 1550–1604), English churchman and academic
Hugh Gray (politician) (1916–2002), English Labour Party MP and University of London lecturer
Hugh Gray (priest) (1921—c.2003), Irish Archdeacon of Ossory and Leighlin from 1983 to 1992